A House were an Irish rock band that was active in Dublin from the 1985 to 1997, and recognized for the clever, "often bitter or irony laden lyrics of frontman Dave Couse ... bolstered by the [band's] seemingly effortless musicality". The single "Endless Art" is one of their best known charting successes.

Career

Beginnings
Formed in Dublin in 1985 by former members of the band Last Chance, vocalist Dave Couse, guitarist Fergal Bunbury, Drummer Dermot Wylie were joined by bassist Martin Healy (who had all been schoolfriends at Templeogue College),  came together as A House. The band honed their live skills in the pubs of Dublin, performing in McGonagle's club (best known internationally as the venue where U2 cut their teeth in the late seventies), at free gigs in the Phoenix Park, and turns on RTÉ's TV GaGa and Dave Fanning's radio sessions.

The earliest recorded appearance for the band was on a charity compilation called Blackrock Youth Aid '85, put together at Newpark School. This was followed by tracks on two live compilations: A House contributed a song whose title is representative of the band's early spirit, "On Your Bike Wench, and Let's Have the Back of You", to the EP Live at the Underground (1986), recorded in September 1985 (and only available) in The Underground club in Dublin, and featuring other contemporary up and coming bands such as Something Happens and The Stars of Heaven; the Street Carnival Rock EP (1987) includes songs recorded as Dave Fanning sessions, and finds A House, performing a song called "What A Nice Evening To Take The Girls Up The Mountains".

These beginnings were followed up by two self-released singles, "Kick Me Again Jesus" and "Snowball Down". A House released these on the label RIP Records.

On Our Big Fat Merry-Go-Round and I Want Too Much
Recording a John Peel Session for BBC radio in the United Kingdom, and gaining regional popularity, the band signed with Blanco y Negro who released the singles "Heart Happy" and "Call Me Blue" in Ireland and the UK. The latter was backed by a video and was relatively successful, receiving appreciable airplay and reaching number 28 in the Irish charts, as well as having some impact in the US. These singles were followed by A House's first album On Our Big Fat Merry-Go-Round in 1988.  The band then toured with the Go-Betweens, and "Call Me Blue" reached number 3 in the Billboard College Charts in 1989.

A promo version of "Call Me Blue" for the US tour included a track labelled "Some Intense Irish Brogue" which was a short interview with the band. Even in Ireland, however, some listeners found Couse's "yelp of a voice" not quite suited to the slightly quirky but basically mainstream rock style of Merry-Go-Round. Following the tour, the band recorded the album I Want Too Much in 1989 on the small Irish island of Inishboffin. The response of the press was good, but record sales were poor, and Blanco y Negro decided to drop the band. Eventually they were picked up by Setanta, a London-based independent label tending to focus on Irish acts.

Dermot Wylie also quit the band in this period, to be replaced by Dave Dawson.

I Am the Greatest, new members and the Setanta years

Doodle and Bingo
Towards the end of 1990 and into 1991, Setanta released two A House EPs: Doodle and Bingo. The latter featured the track "Endless Art", on which A House first worked with Orange Juice singer Edwyn Collins as producer. A House met Collins because he was also signed to Setanta, and it was the beginning of a long and fruitful collaboration as post-A House Couse and Collins remained friends and continued to work together. Setanta also facilitated a relationship between A House and countrymen The Frank and Walters, with members of A House contributing production work to several Frank and Walters' albums.

"Endless Art"
With the sort of commercial luck that sometimes hit A House hard, in the week that "Endless Art" was the most played song on British radio, Setanta, which was only teething as a label, could not get enough copies into the shops to take advantage of the situation (Keith Cullen of Setanta had already had to borrow money from his father to fund the recording of the song). Parlophone Records tried to step in, redistributing 50,000 copies, but by the time these reached the shops it was too late and the re-released version of "Endless Art" (1992) did not get the same radio support, although it did reach the UK Top 50.

"Endless Art" had also benefitted from an accompanying video using clever stop motion animation which gained significant airplay on MTV in Europe, but again due to the bad timing with the song's distribution, the video seemed to be everywhere but the record was not selling. Nevertheless, "Endless Art" became A House's signature, replacing "Call Me Blue" as the song everyone associated with them. The video was memorable, and the song itself – somewhat unusual in its musical approach, and even more so in its lyrics, which led off with a quotation from Oscar Wilde and ran through an extensive roster of famous artists from various fields, all dead, with years of births and deaths specified – stabilized the band as a cult favorite among indie lovers, and is the paradigm of the surprisingly successful "list" style of song which Couse has frequently used (the first example of this style had been the title track on I Want Too Much).

At the time, however, the band had run into criticism because all the artists mentioned in the original "Bingo" release of the song were men. Despite the facetious excuse that they thought Joan Miró was a woman, they tried to make amends by making available a second version of the song, called "More Endless Art", which lists only women artists, as the B-side of the single version. Controversy aside, "Endless Art" is frequently featured on representative compilations of Irish rock and pop music. The 12" single included two other tracks, "Freak Show" and "Charity" which had been recorded for the band's second John Peel Session early in 1992.

I Am the Greatest
The Parlophone distribution of "Endless Art" was the flagship single from A House's new album, called I Am the Greatest (1991), Parolophone again taking over distribution from Setanta. This new record represented a musical expansion for A House. Alongside new drummer Dawson, the recording introduced two other new members to the band, Susan Kavanagh, who had sung with a Dublin band named 'Giant', and had been working on the TV show Jo Maxi, on backing vocals, and David Morrissey on keyboards. This new trio remained with A House until it dissolved although they were less involved in the creative process than the remaining original trio. However, their presence enabled A House to significantly further the transition begun on I Want Too Much beyond the fairly straightforward sound of Merry-Go-Round to a broader musical palette. This was enabled further on "I Am the Greatest" by Collins's production work, and extra contributions from Susie Honeyman's violin.

Lyrically, the songs on the record addressed themes running from satire of societal and religious pieties, through excruciating examinations of personal fears, to the title track, on which the three core band members ruminate in spoken word fashion on their lives, their regrets, their jealousies, and the state of music in the 1990s. The cover artwork was, as always, by Fergal Bunbury with an image by Irish photographer Amelia Stein, and a second single from the album, "Take It Easy On Me" (1992), was also released.

Wide Eyed and Ignorant and No More Apologies
I Am the Greatest is A House's most significant legacy, and is cited by many as one of the best ever released by an Irish band. But it was followed by two more albums on Setanta. Wide-Eyed and Ignorant was released in 1994 to little notice outside of the band's fan-base, although the single "Here Come the Good Times" was A House's only UK Top 40 chart placing, reaching number 37. In 2002 this song experienced a rather unusual second life on the Irish charts when it was chosen by popular vote on national radio to be rerecorded, with new lyrics, as a team anthem and charity single by the Irish soccer squad in the run up to the 2002 World Cup.

Despite the relative success of "Here Come the Good Times", the good times never really came for A House. In the popular music market place this was probably largely because the band refused to do anything but their own thing, which lent extra resonance to the title of their fifth and final album, No More Apologies, released in 1996. It was already known that A House would call it quits the year after that, but No More Apologies, a collection of "twisted beauties", allowed them bow out, masters till of themselves and of "disturbing melodies reflecting the world as seen through their own, strangely coloured, spectacles".

Break up
A House broke up in 1997. The demise of A House was marked by an emotional concert in Dublin on 28 February, attended by the band members' families and packing out the Olympia Theatre. Although visibly moved by the occasion, Couse, ever sarcastic, wondered from stage if A House would have had to break up at all had everyone in attendance bought their records. But no one wanted to leave the Olympia, and A House went out on a high, producing
a farewell show last weekend [that was] one of the most cathartic and genuinely disconcerting live events that this column has seen or heard in 15 years. No caro meos, no undue fusses and no forced sentiment, A House came over like they’ve always come over, always four and often six-square, cocksure and strutted-up like they knew, just knew, how damned good they were and how damned good it was what they were leaving behind them.
Even so, five years later Couse could still wonder how the apparent fondness of so many fans for his band had never really carried over to record sales.

Critique
On the release of a best of album in 2002 (The Way We Were) one British reviewer wondered if they were one of the great lost bands of all time, or if most of the world had been right to ignore their "Gaelic charms". On the evidence of the retrospective collection he decided that the answer was "curiously enough, a bit of both". In a specifically Irish context, however, critics writing around the time of A House's demise claimed that there were ways in which "A House is far more important than U2", and that "their passing also arguably [drew] the safety curtain on the first and last great pop movement this country has either seen or heard".

More than ten years after A House's break-up, critics still held A House in high esteem. In 2008 the Irish Times rock critics voted I Am the Greatest the third best Irish album of all time (jointly with Ghostown by The Radiators), behind only Loveless by My Bloody Valentine and Achtung Baby by U2.

After A House
Following the breakup of A House, Couse and Bunbury started a new project together under the moniker Lokomotiv and recorded an album, but this was never released and Lokomotiv were only ever represented by one single, "Next Time Round" (2000). Couse went on to a solo career and, beginning with Genes in 2003, has released  three albums so far, two under his own name, and one billed as by Couse and The Impossible. Bunbury continues as Couse's frequent musical collaborator and live accompanist. Couse now hosts a weekly radio music show on Irish national radio station, Today FM.

Martin Healy also took on a couple of different projects. He formed the electro-rock band Petrol with French musician Julie Peel, although they failed to progress far; nonetheless, this was Peel's first entry into music, and she enjoyed working with someone who was "kind of famous" in Ireland, although they, "never actually played a gig - only did studio work and rehearsed". A more substantial effort was known as AV8 (sometimes "Aviate"). This began in 1998 when Healy and Niamh McDonald began a writing and performing partnership, to be joined about a year later by French guitarist Morgan Pincot. AV8 recorded an album called Tremor, and was still a going concern in 2002, albeit with a name change to "Sweet Hereafter", but may now be defunct as 
Healy, with David Morrissey, is currently part of Mark Cullen's Pony Club. Healy has also produced for Pony Club, and for other bands such as She's a Beauty.

Four tracks from Tremor (Fireside / Push / Now and Forever / Never Knew What Luck Was) have been available for streaming and/or download on AV8's website.

Since 2020, Fergal Bunbury has been issuing new recordings on Bandcamp under the name FBU62 (effboosicksteetoo). To date he has released two LP's (This is Not For You and We Were Not There at the Beginning) and six EP's (EP1;40 Shades of Greed, EP2;We Will Never Make These Numbers Work and EP3;Tinsel, EP4;Variations in A Major, EP5; Here Come the Bad Times and EP6; Out of Tempo).

Discography

Albums

EPs

Compilation appearances

Singles

1 - Though failing to chart on the U.S. Billboard Hot 100, the song managed to chart at No. 9 on the U.S. Billboard Modern Rock Tracks chart.
2 - Also failing to chart on the U.S. Hot 100, but the song managed to bubble under the Radio and Records Top 50 pop chart.

John Peel sessions
 Session, 25 January 1987, produced by Dale Griffin.
 "Call Me Blue" / "Y.O.U." / "Hit Me Over the Head with Your Handbag Dear" / "Heart Happy"
 Session, 2 February 1992, at Maida Vale Studio, produced by Dale Griffin.
 "Endless Art" / "Charity" / "Freakshow" / "Force Feed"

References

External links
A House homepage with discography and lyrics
The Irish Music Database has an entry and family tree for A House 
A House entry in The Irish Punk & New Wave Discography
AV8 webpage

Musical groups established in 1985
Musical groups disestablished in 1997
Irish alternative rock groups
Blanco y Negro Records artists
Parlophone artists
Setanta Records artists
Sire Records artists
MCA Records artists
Musical groups from Dublin (city)
1985 establishments in Ireland